The Art of the Steal may refer to:

 The Art of the Steal (book), a 2002 book by Frank Abagnale about confidence tricks
 The Art of the Steal (2009 film), a documentary film about the relocation of the Barnes collection
 The Art of the Steal (In Plain Sight episode), a 2011 episode of the USA Network original series In Plain Sight
 The Art of the Steal (2013 film), a comedy film